Cyrenoididae is a taxonomic family of saltwater clams, marine bivalve mollusks in the superfamily Cyrenoidea.

Genera and species 
Genera and species within the family Cyrenoididae include:
Cyrenoida de Joannis, 1835 (syn. Cyrenella Deshayes, 1836)
Cyrenoida cumingii
Cyrenoida cyrenella
Cyrenoida dupontia de Joannis, 1835
Cyrenoida floridana (Dall, 1896) – Florida marsh clam
Cyrenoida oblonga
Cyrenoida panamensis
Cyrenoida rhodopyga
Cyrenoida rosea
Cyrenoida senegalensis Deshayes

References

 
Bivalve families